Habib, sometimes written as Habeeb, is an Arabic masculine given name, occasional surname, and honorific, with the meaning "beloved" or "my love", or "darling". It also forms the famous Arabic word ‘Habibi’ which is used to refer to a friend or a significant other in the aspect of love or admiration.  

The name is popular throughout the Muslim World, though particularly in the Middle East and Africa. In other countries, especially in Yemen and Southeast Asian countries such as Brunei, Singapore, Indonesia and Malaysia, it is an honorific to address a Muslim scholar of Sayyid (a descendant of Muhammad) families and where it is one of the names of the Islamic prophet Muhammad – حبيب الله Habib Allah (Habibullah/ Habiballah) - "Most Beloved of Allah (God)".

The name, as is the case with other Arabic names, is not only confined to Muslims. Notable examples of Christian individuals named Habib include Habib the Deacon,  Gabriel Habib and the Philosopher Habib.

Habiba is the female equivalent.

Etymology 
The name stem from the Arabic verb ḥabba (حَبَّ), meaning to "love", "admire, be fond of"

Another variant which is used as a given name and adjective of the stem from that verb is "maḥbūb" (مَحْبُوب) meaning "well-beloved", commonly written as Mahbub, the female equivalent Mahbuba (Arabic: maḥbūbah مَحْبُوبَة).

The Hebrew equivalent of the name is Haviv (Hebrew: חָבִיב) used as both a first name and last name with the same meaning, "darling" or "likeable" in Hebrew.

Surname
 Aftab Habib, English cricket player
 Anwara Habib, d.2018, Bangladeshi politician
 Arif Habib, Pakistani businessman
 Brian Habib, American football player
 Cyrus Habib, American Jesuit, politician
 Dina Powell nee Habib, Egyptian-born American government official
 Irfan Habib, Indian historian
 Jawed Habib,  Indian  hairstylist and businessman 
 Mamdouh Habib, Australian-Egyptian once held at Guantanamo Bay
 Meyer Habib, French politician
 Philip Habib, d.1992, American diplomat
 Rafik Habib, Egyptian researcher, activist, author, and politician.
 Ralph Habib, d.1969, French film director of Lebanese and Egyptian origin
 Huzama Habayeb, Palestinian novelist, columnist and translator

Given name

Habib
Habib The Deacon, Syriac Christian martyr
Habib (singer) (1947–2016), Iranian pop singer and songwriter
Habib Achour (1913–1999), Tunisian trade unionist
Habib Ben Ali (1941–1996), Tunisian criminal and brother of Zine el-Abidine Ben Ali
Habib Beye (born 1977), French-Senegalese footballer
Habib Borjian, linguist
Habib Bourguiba (1903–2000), Tunisian politician
Habib Bourguiba Jr. (1927–2009), Tunisian diplomat
Habib Dehghani (born 1983), Iranian footballer
Habib Diallo (born 1995), Senegalese professional footballer
Habib Esfahani (1835-1983), Iranian poet, grammarian and translator
Habib ibn Maslama al-Fihri, 7th-century Arab general
Habib Girgis  (1876–1951) Egyptian Dean and Coptic Saint
Habib Habibou (born 1987), French footballer
Habib Jemli, Tunisian politician
Habib Kashani (born 1955), Iranian businessman
Habib Koité (born 1958), Malian musician
Habib Levy (1896–1984), Iranian Jewish historian
Habib Nasib Nader (born 1979), British actor
Habib Sabet (1903–1993), Iranian businessman
Habib Samaei (1905–1946) Iranian musician
Habib Wahid (born 1976), Bangladeshi composer and musician
Habib Zargarpour (born 1964), Iranian art director

Habeeb 

 Habeeb Zain Arif (born 1973), Indian politician 
 Habeeb Salloum, Arab-Canadian freelance writer

Khabib 
 Khabib Allakhverdiev (born 1982), Russian boxer
 Khabib Ilyaletdinov (born 1965), Russian footballer
 Khabib Nurmagomedov "Habib Nur Muhammed" (born 1988), Russian Mixed Martial artist
 Khabib Syukron (born 1988), Indonesian footballer

Other spellings containing the term

Honorific title
 Habib Ali al-Jifri (born 1971), Islamic scholar
 Habib Alwi bin Thahir al-Haddad, mufti of Johor Bahru
 Habib Abdullah ibn Alawi al-Haddad, a Muslim patron saint
 Habib Abu Bakr al-Aydarus, a Muslim patron saint
 Habib Ali bin Abdurrahman Alhabshi, a cleric and preacher
 Habib Muhammad bin Ali bin Yahya, Mufti of Kutai
 Habib Muhammad Luthfi bin Yahya, Indonesian Islamic cleric
 Habib Munzir Al-Musawa, Indonesian Islamic cleric 
 Habib Umar bin Hafiz al-Shaikh Abubakr, Islamic scholar
 Habib Uthman bin Yahya, mufti of Batavia

Fictitious 

 Habib Halal, fictitious character in Australian film Fat Pizza

See also
 Habib Bank
 Habib ur Rahman (disambiguation)
 Habib Public School
 Habibi (disambiguation)
 Habibullah (disambiguation)
 Khabib

References

Arabic masculine given names
Arabic-language surnames
Bosniak masculine given names
Bosnian masculine given names
Iranian masculine given names
Islamic honorifics
Pakistani masculine given names